Deborah Kaplan  (born November 11, 1970) is an American screenwriter and film director.

Early life
Deborah Kaplan was born and raised in Abington, Pennsylvania. Born to Susan Kaplan. She went to Abington Senior High School, which is the school her movie Can’t Hardly Wait is based on.

Kaplan attended the Tisch School of the Arts of New York University (NYU). While there she met her creative partner Harry Elfont. They have since written several films together, and directed both Can't Hardly Wait starring Jennifer Love Hewitt, Ethan Embry and Seth Green and Josie and the Pussycats, which featured Rachael Leigh Cook, Tara Reid, Rosario Dawson and Alan Cumming.

Personal life
Kaplan married actor Breckin Meyer on October 14, 2001. They have two daughters together. The couple's separation and subsequent divorce was announced in 2012.

Filmography as screenwriter (with Harry Elfont)

References

External links

Screenwriters from Pennsylvania
American women film directors
Living people
Place of birth missing (living people)
Tisch School of the Arts alumni
People from Abington Township, Montgomery County, Pennsylvania
American women screenwriters
Film directors from Pennsylvania
1970 births
20th-century American screenwriters
20th-century American women writers
21st-century American screenwriters
21st-century American women writers